Justin Douglas (born April 5, 1994) is a Canadian rugby union player, in the sevens discipline.
Douglas was part of Canada's 2014 Commonwealth Games and 2018 Commonwealth Games, with both teams getting knocked out in the group stage.
Douglas won gold as part of Canada's team at the 2015 Pan American Games in Toronto.
In June 2021, Douglas was named to Canada's 2020 Olympic team.

References

1994 births
Living people
Rugby sevens players at the 2014 Commonwealth Games
Rugby sevens players at the 2018 Commonwealth Games
Commonwealth Games rugby sevens players of Canada
Canada international rugby sevens players
Rugby sevens players at the 2015 Pan American Games
Pan American Games gold medalists for Canada
Medalists at the 2015 Pan American Games
Pan American Games medalists in rugby sevens
Rugby sevens players at the 2020 Summer Olympics
Olympic rugby sevens players of Canada